Woody Lake is a lake in the Canadian province of Saskatchewan. It is located in the east-central part of the province in the Porcupine Hills and Porcupine Provincial Forest. The entire lake is in the Woody River Block of Porcupine Hills Provincial Park. Highway 980 provides access to the lake.

Woody Lake is the source of Woody River. Woody River is a river that flows south then east into neighbouring Manitoba and Swan Lake. The main inflow for Woody Lake is a short River that flows south from Elbow Lake, which is fed by Midnight Creek. On the western end of Woody Lake, another short river flows into it from neighbouring Townsend Lake.

Parks and recreation 
Prior to the formation of Porcupine Hills Provincial Park in 2018, the parkland around Woody Lake was a provincial recreation site called Woody River Recreation Site. Access to the lake is at the north-western shore and amenities include a boat launch, picnic area, and fish cleaning station.

Fish species 
Fish commonly found in the lake include walleye, perch, and northern pike.

See also 
List of lakes of Saskatchewan
Tourism in Saskatchewan
Hudson Bay drainage basin

References 

Lakes of Saskatchewan
Hudson Bay No. 394, Saskatchewan